Ryan Forehan-Kelly (born January 14, 1980) is an American professional basketball coach and former player who serves as assistant coach for the Brooklyn Nets of the National Basketball Association (NBA).

Playing career
Forehan-Kelly played for the California Golden Bears. Forehan-Kelly played internationally and in the NBA G League.

Coaching career
Forehan-Kelly was hired as an assistant coach by the Long Island Nets for the 2017–18 NBA G League season. In December 2020, Forehan-Kelly was named as assistant coach for the Brooklyn Nets.

References

External links
 College statistics at Sports-Reference.com

1980 births
Living people
American expatriate basketball people in China
American expatriate basketball people in France
American expatriate basketball people in Japan
American expatriate basketball people in Jordan
American expatriate basketball people in Mexico
American expatriate basketball people in Venezuela
American men's basketball players
Applied Science University basketball players
Basketball coaches from California
Basketball players from California
Besançon BCD players
California Golden Bears men's basketball players
Cocodrilos de Caracas players
Guaiqueríes de Margarita players
Jiangsu Dragons players
Kyoto Hannaryz players
Long Island Nets coaches
Los Angeles D-Fenders players
Scafati Basket players
Shanghai Sharks players
Shooting guards
Small forwards
Sportspeople from Long Beach, California